Jalan Syed Putra (formerly Lornie Drive), Federal Route 2 is a major highway in Kuala Lumpur, Malaysia. It was named after Almarhum Tuanku Syed Putra ibni Almarhum Syed Hassan Jamalullail of Perlis, the third Yang di-Pertuan Agong, which used to reside at Istana Negara which lies at one end of the highway.

Jalan Syed Putra was known as Lornie Drive during the British administration. It was named after J. Lornie, one of the British Residents of Selangor in the 1920s. Lornie was also the president of the Royal Selangor Golf Club in 1926.

Landmarks
At the eastern end of the highway is Wisma Tun Sambanthan, which stands tall over the rest of the structures in the area. Surrounding the building are small banks and offices including the Darul Takaful Finance Area (formerly the UMBC Bank building), the former Sime Darby Securities office, and the Kuala Lumpur & Selangor Chinese Assembly Hall (KLSCAH).

Kuen Cheng High School , one of the country's Chinese independent high schools, sits next to the former Istana Negara, which is located in between Jalan Syed Putra and Jalan Istana. There are two Chinese temples along the road including the Yuen Tong Chee, and the road leading up to the Thean Hou Temple.

Further down the highway sits the KEMAS training centre that is facilitated by the Rural and Regional Development Ministry. The headquarters of the Selangor and Federal Territory Family Planning Association and the Malaysian International Youth Home are also along the road.

The Mid Valley Megamall sits at the western end of the highway, just before the intersection to Jalan Klang Lama and the New Pantai Expressway .

Infrastructure
Along the highway runs Klang River, which has now been paved to support heavy monsoon rain and modern development.

Jalan Syed Putra is now connected to Jalan Tun Sambanthan through different roads while before it was only connected through a bridge across the Klang River.

List of interchanges and junctions

References
 Serene charm on quiet road, The Star, 7 April 2007.

Expressways and highways in the Klang Valley
Highways in Malaysia
Roads in Kuala Lumpur